Two male athletes from Saudi Arabia competed at the 1996 Summer Paralympics in Atlanta, United States.

See also
Saudi Arabia at the Paralympics
Saudi Arabia at the 1996 Summer Olympics

References 

Nations at the 1996 Summer Paralympics
1996
Summer Paralympics